Trey Whitfield School is an elementary school in Brooklyn, New York, USA. The school has many activities including basketball, computer, choir, and drama. The grades range from nursery to 8th grade and there can be more than one class per grade depending on how many students there are.

Founders

Janie C. Whitney 
The school was founded by Ms. Janie C. Whitney who has led the development of the school for over 20 years. Ms. Whitney was born in Cuthbert, Georgia. She attended Long Island University and studied accounting. She had always had a love for children and opened a day-care and after-school program in Bushwick, New York. In 1983, she became co-founder of Bethlehem Baptist Academy. As time went on the school became very productive and showed a strong will to build up a strong academic curriculum with good more character within its students.

A.B. Whitfield
A.B. Whitfield was born in Portsmouth, Virginia. He pursued many high school and college activities such as football, wrestling and track. He would later go on to play professional football. After he retired from football, he went on to earn a master's degree in education. He is the administrator and co owner of Trey Whitfield School. He has 35 years of educational experience and is retired from the NYC Board of Education where he was a teacher for 17 years, taught at elementary school level. He and Janie have also established the "Trey Whitfield Foundation" in memory of their son.

Name change 
The school was originally known as Bethlehem Baptist Academy when it opened, but changed its name when the founders' son Trey Whitfield died in a boating accident while he was a senior attending Brewster Academy. The name change is seen as a tribute to their son who was considered an all-around good person.

References

www.treywhitfieldschool.org

External links 
Trey Whitfield School website
 https://www.nytimes.com/2003/09/24/nyregion/private-school-that-thrives-rules-minority-students-excel-brooklyn-site-it-model.html?pagewanted=1

Private elementary schools in Brooklyn
Private middle schools in Brooklyn